Ness is a village composed of East Ness and West Ness on the south bank of the River Rye in North Yorkshire, England, part of the civil parish of Nunnington.

The name Ness may mean "nose" or "headland" in Medieval Norse, as Ness is the start of the hill that ultimately rises up to become Sutton Bank. It may also come from  Old English, meaning a place at the promontory or projecting ridge.

The village of Ness is believed to have been split into West and East, following the Norman Invasion as the ownership of the village was split between two landlords. This land ownership split still continues today.

To the East of Ness, at the base of the hill, there are a considerable number of springs. Behind Ness Hall there is a large undercover Yorkshire Water reservoir, filled with water pumped from the springs.

Ness has an interesting Roman connection. It is believed a Roman Villa or fort existed on the hill top and various items have been found to support this. Bulmer's Directory (1890) states that a sarcophagus was found in 1616 with the inscription: TITIA PINTA VIXIT xxxviii ET VAL ADIVTORI VIXIT ANN xx ET VARIOLO VIXIT ANN xv VAL VINDICIANVS CONIYGIE T FILLS. Bulmers Directory notes, "This monument, the inscription tells us, was erected by Valerius Vindicianus to the memory of his wife, Titia, who died at the age of 38, and of his two sons Valerius Adjutor and Variolus, who died at the ages of 20 and 15 respectively. Vindician was probably the occupant of the Roman villa, to which the bath and tesselated floor above mentioned belonged; and that whilst in command of the fort or camp here he lost his wife and two sons." Early Ordnance Survey maps show the deemed location of the Sarcophagus.

Ness Hall in East Ness has a large walled garden which has been restored by Cynthia Murray Wells and subsequently Mary Murray Wells assisted by Harriette Murray Wells (daughter of John Skeffington, 14th Viscount Massereene). The garden is available for viewing on set dates each year under the National Garden Scheme.

References

External links

Villages in North Yorkshire